Guyang Town is a town and the county seat of Guzhang County in Hunan, China. Its seat of local government is at Xiaoguzhangping of Hongxin Community.

See also 
 List of township-level divisions of Hunan

References

Guzhang
County seats in Hunan
Towns of Xiangxi Tujia and Miao Autonomous Prefecture